Diamyd may refer to:
 Diamyd Medical
 A vaccine consisting of GAD65, for Type 1 diabetes